Stephen Francis Bungay (born 2 September 1954) is a British management consultant, historian and author, who currently serves as Director of the Ashridge Strategic Management Centre at Hult International Business School.

Biography
Bungay read Modern Languages at Oxford, where he received an MA with First Class Honours. He subsequently studied for a doctorate in philosophy at Oxford and the University of Tübingen in Germany, where he was a Research Fellow of the Humboldt Foundation. Stephen worked in the London and Munich offices of The Boston Consulting Group for a total of seventeen years. On leaving BCG, he ran a Division of an insurance company before subsequently joining the Ashridge Strategic Management Centre. He teaches on several executive programmes at Ashridge Executive Education program at Hult International Business School, and works as an independent consultant, teacher and speaker.
 
He published his first book on military history, The Most Dangerous Enemy – A History of the Battle of Britain, in 2000. A new illustrated edition appeared in 2010. His second history book, Alamein, was published in 2002. Since 2004 he has also been a frequent contributor to television programmes. He featured in the Channel 4 series 'Spitfire Ace', and has appeared on individual programmes for Channel 5, BBC 2 and BBC 4, the History Channel, National Geographic and TV New Zealand.

Personal life
He married Atalanta Beaumont in 1987, the daughter of Tim Beaumont, Baron Beaumont of Whitley. They have two sons born in 1990 and 1994.

Publications
 Beauty and Truth: a Study of Hegel's Aesthetics (1984) 
 The Most Dangerous Enemy: a History of the Battle of Britain (2001) 
 Alamein (2002) 
 The Art of Action: How Leaders Close the Gaps Between Plans, Actions and Results (2010)

References

External links 
 

1954 births
Living people
British historians
British management consultants
People from Edenbridge, Kent
Hult International Business School faculty
Historians of World War II